John Eibner (born June 1952) is an American Christian human rights activist.  He is the CEO of Christian Solidarity International-USA.  He also served on the board of the American Anti-Slavery Group, and is a member of the Institute of Historical Research at the University of London.

Life and career 
Eibner was born and raised in upstate New York, but has lived for most of his adult life in Britain and Switzerland. He is married with two daughters.

Eibner received a BA degree in history from Barrington College in Rhode Island, and his Ph.D. in history from the University of London.

From 1986 to 1990, Eibner worked for the Keston Institute in London, an organization that monitored and promoted religious freedom in the former communist countries of Eastern Europe.

In 1990, Eibner joined Christian Solidarity International. During the Armenia-Azerbaijan War of 1992-1993, Eibner led CSI relief expeditions to CSI to Armenians in the blockaded territory of Nagorno-Karabakh, and to Azerbaijanis displaced from their homes in Nagorno-Karabakh.

In 1992, the New Sudan Council of Churches invited Eibner to come to southern Sudan to observe the effect of the Sudanese civil war on Sudan's Christian population. The atrocities Eibner witnessed there, including mass slaughter and slave raiding by government-supported militias, led him to describe the Sudanese government's campaign against the south as "genocide" in an October 1992 article for Wall Street Journal Europe.  According to author Richard Cockett, Eibner's article marks the first use of the word "genocide" in connection with modern Sudan.

Under Eibner's leadership, CSI became the first advocacy group on the ground during the Sudanese civil war.  Eibner also pioneered the practice of slave redemption, partnering with local Christian and Muslim tribes to retrieve and negotiate for the release of slaves captured by Arab raiders from the north.  CSI has documented over 80,000 individuals who have returned from slavery through this system.

In 2008, Eibner started a campaign called Save Iraqi Christians in order to draw attention to mass violence directed at Iraq's Christian minority. He has traveled to Iraq many times to deliver supplies to Christian refugees, document cases of anti-Christian violence, and meet with local church leaders.

Eibner has testified before the U.S. House of Representatives, the Subcommittee on Africa, the Congressional Human Rights Caucus and the United Nations Commission on Human Rights.  Eibner frequently briefs senior policymakers at the White House and the State Department about religious persecution abroad, and has led numerous delegations of lawmakers and journalists to critical areas in Sudan  and Nagorno-Karabakh.

Eibner's writings have appeared in many publications around the world, including The Wall Street Journal Europe, The Boston Globe, The Catholic Herald, The International Herald Tribune, The Middle East Quarterly, The Times (United Kingdom) and The Toronto Globe and Mail.

Bibliography 
In the eye of the Romanian storm: the Heroic Story of Pastor Laszlo Tokes, by Felix Corley and John Eibner, published by Old Tappan, 1990, .
Ethnic cleaning in progress: War in Nagorno-Karabakh, by Caroline Cox and John Eibner, published by the Institute for Religious Minorities in the Islamic World, 1993, .
Christians in Egypt: Church under siege, John Eibner, ed., published by the Institute for Religious Minorities in the Islamic World, 1993, .

References

External links
 Profile at SourceWatch

Living people
American human rights activists
Alumni of the University of London
Barrington College alumni
American expatriates in Switzerland
American expatriates in the United Kingdom
1952 births